KRTK may refer to:

 KRTK (FM), a radio station (93.3 FM) in Hermann, Missouri, United States
 KPCQ, a radio station (1490 AM) in Chubbuck, Idaho, United States, which held the call sign KRTK from 1998 to 2019
 KTHT, a radio station (97.1 FM) in Cleveland, Texas, United States, which held the call sign KRTK from 1991 to 1995 and in 1997